Pobalscoil Chloich Cheannfhaola (PCC), also known as PCC Falcarragh,  is a voluntary/state-funded, coeducational, inter-denominational secondary school in Falcarragh, County Donegal, Ireland. Located north of the town centre of Falcarragh, its catchment area includes the districts of Cloughaneely, Dunfanaghy and Creeslough, although they have also traditionally attracted some students from Gweedore and The Rosses.

History
Pobalscoil Chloich Cheannfhaola was founded in 1972, replacing Gortahork Vocational School, which had been the main secondary school in the area since 1961.

Sport
Soccer, gaelic football and basketball are the main sporting activities of the school. The school has won several All-Ireland and Ulster titles in all three sports.

Honours

Soccer
All-Ireland
 1981/82 FAI Schools Senior A Boys (U-19) Champions
 2017/18 FAI Schools Minor B Boys (U-15) Champions
 2018/19 FAI Schools Minor B Boys (U-15) Champions

Ulster
 1981/82 FAI Schools Senior A Boys (U-19) Champions
 2001/02 FAI Schools Senior A Boys (U-19) Champions
 2005/06 FAI Schools Senior A Boys (U-19) Champions
 2017/18 FAI Schools Senior B Boys (U-19) Champions
 2017/18 FAI Schools Junior B Boys (U-17) Champions
 2017/18 FAI Schools Minor B Boys (U-15) Champions
 2018/19 FAI Schools Junior B Boys (U-17) Champions
 2018/19 FAI Schools Minor B Boys (U-15) Champions
 2019/20 FAI Schools Minor B Boys (U-15) Champions

Gaelic Football
Ulster
Under 19
 1973/74 Dalton Cup (Ulster U-19 B) Champions
 1982/83 MacLarnon Cup (Ulster U-19 B) Champions
 1984/85 MacLarnon Cup (Ulster U-19 B) Champions
 1985/86 MacLarnon Cup (Ulster U-19 B) Champions

Ulster
Under 17
 1982/83 Ulster Herald Cup (Ulster U-17 B) Champions

Ulster
Under 16
 2013/14 Arthurs Cup (Ulster U-16 A) Champions

Ulster
Under 15
 1978/79 Loch an Iúir Cup (Ulster U-15 B) Champions
 1980/81 Loch an Iúir Cup (Ulster U-15 B) Champions

Ulster
Under 14
 1979/80 Corn Cholm Cille (Ulster U-14 B) Champions
 1988/89 Corn Cholm Cille (Ulster U-14 B) Champions
 2016/17 McDevitt Cup (Ulster U-14 C) Champions

Donegal
 2004/05 Donegal Senior A Champions
 2013/14 Donegal U-16 A Champions
 2015/16 Donegal U-14 A Champions
 2018/19 Donegal U-16 A Champions

Notable alumni

Gaelic football
 Kevin Cassidy - Donegal and Gaoth Dobhair Gaelic Football Captain, Two-Time All-Star (2002, 2011)
 Barry Cunningham - Donegal and Killybegs Gaelic Footballer, Member of 1992 All-Ireland Winning Team
 John Cunningham - Donegal and Killybegs Gaelic Footballer, Member of 1992 All-Ireland Winning Team
 Martin McElhinney - Donegal and St. Michael's Gaelic Footballer, Member of 2012 All-Ireland Winning Team
 Eamon McGee - Donegal and Gaoth Dobhair Gaelic Footballer, Member of 2012 All-Ireland Winning Team
 Neil McGee - Donegal and Gaoth Dobhair Gaelic Footballer, Member of 2012 All-Ireland Winning Team, Three-Time All-Star (2011, 2012, 2014)
 Barry McGowan - Donegal and Killybegs Gaelic Footballer, Member of 1992 All-Ireland Winning Team
 Daniel McLaughlin - Donegal and St. Michael's Gaelic Footballer, Member of 2012 All-Ireland Winning Team
 Christy Toye - Donegal and St. Michael's Gaelic Football Captain, Member of 2012 All-Ireland Winning Team
 Peter Witherow - Donegal and St. Michael's Gaelic Footballer, Member of 2012 All-Ireland Winning Team
Thomas “windows” Duggan Jr Window fitter PCC Icon

Other
 Annemarie Ní Churreáin - poet
 Breandán de Gallaí - professional Irish dancer who is best known for his lead role in Riverdance

References

Secondary schools in County Donegal
1972 establishments in Ireland
Educational institutions established in 1972